Orest Fyodorovich Miller (4 August 1833 – 1 June 1889) was a Russian folklorist, professor in Russian literature, of Baltic German origin from Estonia. He is the author of the book "Илья Муромец и богатырство киевское" ("Ilya Muromets and the Kievan bogatyrs" )

References

1833 births
1889 deaths
Russian folklorists

He was the author of Fyodor Mikhailovich Dostoevsky ' s first ever biography (1883)